The Atlanta 500 Classic was an Indy Racing League event held at the Atlanta Motor Speedway from 1998 until 2001.

Previous USAC and CART races had been held at the track dating to 1965.  The first National Championship races in Atlanta were held at Atlanta Motordrome, a 2-mile (3.2 km) dirt oval, in 1910.  Later AAA and USAC races were held at Lakewood Speedway, a dirt oval in Atlanta.

Past winners

Atlanta Motordrome

 Shared drive

Lakewood Speedway

Atlanta Motor Speedway

External links
Champ Car Stats: Motordrome archive
Champ Car Stats: Lakewood archive
Champ Car Stats: Atlanta archive

Former IndyCar Series races
Champ Car races
Motorsport in Georgia (U.S. state)